Wacław Sąsiadek (4 March 1931 – 2 October 2017) was a Polish footballer who played as a forward. He also played for the Poland national football team, and was a football manager.

Career 
Sąsiadek began playing at the youth level with Pogoń Katowice, and ultimately joined the senior team in 1946. In 1949, he played in Liga Polska with Legia Warsaw where he played for five seasons. In 1954, he signed with Polonia Bytom where in his debut season he assisted in securing the Polish Championship. He concluded his career in the 1960-61 season with Silesia Miechowice after sustaining a knee injury.  

He died on October 2, 2017.

International career 
He made his debut for the Poland national football team on October 17, 1948 in a friendly match against Finland. In the match he made history as he became the youngest player to represent Poland at the age of 17 until broken by Włodzimierz Lubański. He later made two additional appearances for the senior national team against Albania, and East Germany. He also played for the Poland national under-18 football team.

Managerial career 
Sąsiadek became the football manager for Urania Ruda Śląska originally in 1968, he would return for another two stints with the club in 1973-76, and in 1981-85. He also managed CKS Czeladź, GKS Tychy, Wisłoka Dębica, and former club Polonia Bytom. In 1978, he managed abroad in the National Soccer League with the Toronto Falcons where he secured the NSL Cup against Hamilton Italo-Canadians.

References 
 

1931 births
2017 deaths
Polish footballers
Poland international footballers
Association football forwards
Polish football managers
Polish expatriate football managers
Legia Warsaw players
Polonia Bytom players
Ekstraklasa players
GKS Tychy managers
Polonia Bytom managers
Canadian National Soccer League coaches
Sportspeople from Lviv
People from Lwów Voivodeship